Cooper Point may refer to:

Cooper Point, Camden, a neighborhood in New Jersey
Cooper Point (Thurston County, Washington), a cape in the state of Washington